Badgley is a surname. Notable people with the surname include:

Catherine E. Badgley, paleontologist
Francis Badgley (doctor) (1807–1863)
Francis Badgley (merchant) (1767–1841)
Helen Badgley (1908–1977), actress
Michael Badgley (born 1995), American football player
Penn Badgley (born 1986), actor
Sidney Badgley (1850–1917), architect
William Badgley (1801–1888), judge and attorney
William E. Badgley, documentary film and television producer

See also
Badgley Mischka